Empress Chu (褚皇后) may refer to:

Chu Suanzi (324–384), consort and empress dowager during the Jin dynasty, wife of Emperor Kang
Chu Lingyuan (384–436), consort during the Jin dynasty, wife of Emperor Gong
Chu Lingqu ( 496–501), consort during the Southern Qi dynasty

See also
Empress Zhu (disambiguation)

Chu